Matt Devlin Moussilou Massamba (born 1 June 1982) is a professional footballer who plays as a striker for FC Meyrin. Born in France, he has been capped by Congo at international level.

Club career
On 2 April 2005, he scored four goals for Lille in a 8–0 win over Istres, including a hat-trick in four minutes to be the fastest in Ligue 1 history. On 3 February 2007, he played his first Ligue 1 match for Saint-Étienne against Sedan. He played as a striker for OGC Nice and after returning from a loan to Al-Arabi, he was on 27 August 2009 released from his club.

On 7 September 2009, it was announced that he had joined Swansea City on trial but on 6 October 2009 he signed for Boulogne on a free transfer, until the end of the season. With Boulogne's relegation at the end of the campaign, Moussilou did not re-sign. In January 2011, he signed with Lausanne-Sport until the end of the 2010–11 season. Moussilou would go on to spend two and half years with the club before moving on to sign for Tunisian-side Club Africain.

International career
In 2006, Moussilou was called up to represent the national team of the Republic of the Congo by their new coach Noel Tosi. Since Moussilou had represented France at under-21 level, however, FIFA ruled against this as he should have applied for the change in his national status before 31 December 2005. However, the rule was changed, and finally he made a full international debut for Congo on 12 August 2009 in a friendly against Morocco. He scored his first goal in this match.

International goals
Scores and results list Congo's goal tally first, score column indicates score after each Moussilou goal.

Personal life
Moussilou was born in Paris, France and is of Beninese and Congolese descent.

Honours
Lille
UEFA Intertoto Cup: 2004

References

External links
 
 

1982 births
Living people
Footballers from Paris
French footballers
Republic of the Congo footballers
French sportspeople of Republic of the Congo descent
French sportspeople of Beninese descent
French expatriate footballers
Republic of the Congo expatriate footballers
Republic of the Congo expatriate sportspeople in Qatar
Republic of the Congo expatriate sportspeople in Switzerland
Republic of the Congo expatriate sportspeople in Tunisia
Association football forwards
France under-21 international footballers
Republic of the Congo international footballers
Lille OSC players
OGC Nice players
AS Saint-Étienne players
Olympique de Marseille players
Al-Arabi SC (Qatar) players
US Boulogne players
FC Lausanne-Sport players
Club Africain players
Amiens SC players
FC Le Mont players
Yverdon-Sport FC players
FC Meyrin players
Ligue 1 players
Swiss Super League players
Swiss Challenge League players
Expatriate footballers in Qatar
Expatriate footballers in Switzerland
Expatriate footballers in Tunisia
Qatar Stars League players
Black French sportspeople